Events in the year 1966 in Bulgaria.

Incumbents 

 General Secretaries of the Bulgarian Communist Party: Todor Zhivkov
 Chairmen of the Council of Ministers: Todor Zhivkov

Events 

 November 24 – TABSO Flight LZ101, a scheduled service of the Bulgarian national airline from Sofia via Budapest and Prague to East Berlin, crashed near Bratislava. The crash, which killed all 82 passengers and crew on board, remains Slovakia's worst air disaster in history.
 February 27 – Parliamentary elections were held in Bulgaria.

Sports

References 

 
1960s in Bulgaria
Years of the 20th century in Bulgaria
Bulgaria
Bulgaria